Northriding is a suburb of Randburg, in Region C - formerly Johannesburg Region 5, South Africa.
The suburb was named after one of the three historic subdivisions of Yorkshire. 'North' was favoured at the time due to  North Riding's location north of the CBD of Johannesburg.
The Suburb formerly fell under the jurisdiction of the Randburg Town Council before it was incorporated into the City of Johannesburg Metropolitan area.
Of the original 3 farms that were joined to form Randburg, North riding was located on the Olievenhout farm.

North Riding fully encloses the Suburb of Bellair Park.
The area was once prominently known as a horse riding and stable stronghold in the north of Johannesburg, but gave way to other areas such as Kyalami and Honeydew extensions. This can be seen in the road and street names.
Previously the area was rather rural, had Agricultural Holding status and is still referred to as Northriding A.H. by some. After 1996 North Riding developed rapidly, in both the residential and commercial sector.

Surrounding suburbs include: Olivedale, Northworld, Northwold Garden, Northgate, Johannesburg North, Noordhang and Golden Harvest.

Main streets in the suburb include Blandford, Bellair and Malibongwe (previously Hans Strijdom) with the original entrance roads of Windsor and Smith, Ascot and Hyperion.
North Riding includes various shopping centers and bed and breakfast accommodation. Various streams flow through the area, one such flowing from west to north-east is the Olievenhoutspoort.

Miriam Makeba lived in the suburb at the time of her death.

References

Johannesburg Region C